Horowhenua Chronicle is a regional newspaper for the Horowhenua district, encompassing Foxton, Shannon, Tokomaru and Levin. It is owned by NZME and is delivered free to every home in the Horowhenua region on Fridays. 

It was established in 1893, and was originally a daily paid newspaper called the Daily Chronicle until 2008, when it become a free community newspaper delivered on Wednesdays and Fridays. 

In May 2020 the Horowhenua Chronicle was reduced to only one edition each week on Fridays only. 

The Horowhenua Chronicle is one of two Horowhenua community newspapers, the other being Stuff's Horowhenua Mail delivered on Thursdays.

References

External links 
Official Web site

Online Newspaper

Newspapers published in New Zealand
Manawatū-Whanganui
Mass media in Levin, New Zealand
New Zealand Media and Entertainment